Arhizo Polemo (Greek: Αρχίζω Πόλεμο; English: I Declare War) is the seventh studio album by Greek artist, Katy Garbi. It was released on 10 May 1996 by Sony Music Greece and certified gold in 14 days, but after months received triple-platinum certification, selling over 180,000 units*. The majority of the album was written by Phoebus with contributions by Andreas Mexas, Charis Andreadis, Giannis Doxas and Smaroula Maragkoudaki. It was ranked among the best-selling Greek albums of 1996 and is Katy's top-seller album, containing many of her most successful songs like "Tha Melagholiso", "Mia Fora Ki Enan Kairo", "Hamena" and "Perasmena Xehasmena".

In 1996, triple-platinum was the album whose sales exceeded 180,000 units.

Track listing

Music videos
The success of the album released nine of twelve songs becoming singles to radio stations with music videos, except the songs "Ftou Xelefteria" and "Agio Kalokairi", and gained massive airplay.

"Arhizo Polemo" (Αρχίζω Πόλεμο; I Declare War)(Director:)
"Tha Melagholiso" (Μια Φορά Κι Έναν Καιρό; I'll Be Sad)(Director:)
 "Hamena" (Χαμένα; Lost)
"Mia Fora Ki Enan Kairo" (Μια Φορά Κι Έναν Καιρό; Once Upon A Time)(Director:)
 "Perasmena Xehasmena" (Περασμένα Ξεχασμένα; Forgotten Past)Director:
"1,000,000 Nihtes" (1.000.000 Νύχτες; 1,000,000 Nights)(Director:)
 "Apo Do Kai Pio Pera" (Από Δω Και Πιο Πέρα; From Here To Beyond)(Director:)
 "Ftou Xelefteria" ((Φτου Ξελευτερία; We're Free)(Director:)
 "Agio Kalokairi" (Άγιο Καλοκαίρι; Holy Summer)(Director:)

Credits 
Credits adapted from liner notes.

Personnel 

 Charis Andreadis – orchestration (tracks: 4, 5, 9, 10)
 Aggelos Avgeris – second vocal (tracks: 6, 12)
 Giannis Barakos – bass (tracks: 3, 12)
 Giannis Bithikotsis – bouzouki (tracks: 3, 4, 9, 10, 11) / cura (tracks: 1, 2, 3, 11) / baglama (tracks: 1, 3, 4, 10, 12)
 Charis Chalkitis – backing vocals (tracks: 4, 5)
 Giorgos Chatzopoulos – guitars (tracks: 9, 10)
 Nikos Chatzopoulos – violin (tracks: 2, 9, 12)
 Rania Dizikiriki – backing vocals (tracks: 1, 2)
 Antonis Gounaris – guitars (tracks: 1, 2, 3, 4, 5, 6, 7, 8, 11, 12) / cümbüş (tracks: 1, 2, 8) / oud (tracks: 10)
 Anna Ioannidou – backing vocals (tracks: 4, 5)
 Giotis Kiourtsoglou – bass (tracks: 1, 6, 8, 11)
 Elli Kokkinou – backing vocals (tracks: 8)
 Dimitris Kokotas – backing vocals (tracks: 1, 8)
 Fedon Lionoudakis – accordion (tracks: 1, 4, 5, 11, 12)
 Andreas Mouzakis – drums (tracks: 1, 3, 6, 8, 11, 12)
 Thimios Papadopoulos – clarinet (tracks: 12)
 Phoebus – orchestration, programming, keyboards (tracks: 1, 2, 3, 4, 6, 7, 8, 11, 12) / backing vocals (tracks: 1, 8)
 Marianda Pieridi – backing vocals (tracks: 1, 2)
 Orestis Plakidis – programming, keyboards (tracks: 4, 5, 9, 10)
 Sandy Politi – backing vocals (tracks: 4, 5)
 Antonis Remos – backing vocals (tracks: 1, 8) / second vocal (tracks: 10)
 Giorgos Roilos – percussion (tracks: 1, 6, 7, 8, 11, 12)
 Dionisis Schinas – backing vocals (tracks: 8)
 Eva Tselidou – backing vocals (tracks: 1, 2)

Production 

 Makis Achladiotis (Sierra studio) – sound engineer (tracks: 9, 10)
 Giannis Aggelakis – make up
 Giannis Doulamis – production manager
 Dis Graphs – art direction
 Giannis Ioannidis (Digital Press Hellas) – mastering
 Giannis Michailidis – hair styling
 Vaggelis Papadopoulos (Sierra studio) – sound engineer (tracks: 1, 2, 3, 6, 7, 8, 11, 12)
 Panagiotis Petronikolos (Sierra studio) – sound engineer (tracks: 1, 2, 3, 4, 5, 6, 7, 8, 11, 12) / mix engineer (all tracks)
 Tasos Vrettos – photographer

Charts

Accolades 
Arhizo Polemo gained four awards at the Pop Corn Music Awards 1996:

 Best Album of the Year
 Best Composition (Tha Melagholiso)
 Best Lyrics (Arhizo Polemo)
 Best Folk Dance Track (Perasmena Xehasmena)

References

1996 albums
Katy Garbi albums
Albums produced by Phoebus (songwriter)
Greek-language albums
Sony Music Greece albums